The anthem of Kamchatka Krai, a krai in far eastern Russia, was adopted in Law of Kamchatka Krai No. 397 of 5 March 2010, "On the Anthem of Kamchatka Krai". The lyrics were written by Boris Dubrovin, and the music was composed by Evgeniy Morozov. The law introducing the anthem came into force on 1 July 2010, the anniversary of the Krai's creation on 1 July 2007.

History 
Kamchatka Krai was formed on 1 July 2007 from the unification of Kamchatka Oblast and Koryak Autonomous Okrug. On 18 August 2008, a competition was announced by the Heraldic Commission to create symbols for the new krai, to "most vividly reflect the historical development of the region, its spiritual, political, economic, cultural and national heritage."

The competition ran from 25 August to 28 November 2008, and the three best anthems were to be awarded 70,000-, 40,000- and 20,000-ruble cash prizes, respectively. The competition was also open to those from other regions of Russia. In November 2007, composer and head of the  Evgeniy Morozov, who had composed the anthem for the former Kamchatka Oblast, had expressed his intention to submit the same anthem to the upcoming competition, saying that it corresponded to the objective in "both music and text". However, he had also stated that the potential for some changes to the lyrics had been discussed, which were eventually implemented in the proposed anthem.

Morozov's anthem was chosen, and on 17 February 2010, a law on the anthem of Kamchatka Krai was adopted at a session of the Legistative Assembly. The law came into force on 1 July 2010, the anniversary of the Krai's creation on 1 July 2007, and anniversary celebrations were accompanied by the first performances of the new anthem, including by the combined choir directed by Morozov.

On 23 November 2010, a selection of official recordings of the anthem were made available on the official website of the Kamchatka Krai government.

The anthem has been performed at several official events since then, such as sporting events, folklore festivals, Flag Day and the anniversary of the formation of Kamchatka Krai.

Lyrics

See also 
 Anthem of Kamchatka Oblast

References 

Regional songs
Culture of Kamchatka Krai
Kamchatka Krai
Kamchatka Krai